Lewis Elmer Ritter (September 7, 1875 in Liverpool, Pennsylvania – May 27, 1952 in Harrisburg, Pennsylvania) was a Major League Baseball catcher who played for the Brooklyn Superbas from 1902 to 1908.

External links

1875 births
1952 deaths
Major League Baseball catchers
Brooklyn Superbas players
Baseball players from Pennsylvania
Minor league baseball managers
Lockhaven Maroons players
Shamokin Reds players
Minneapolis Millers (baseball) players
St. Paul Apostles players
St. Paul Saints (Western League) players
Wheeling Stogies players
Binghamton Bingoes players
Kansas City Blues (baseball) players
Indianapolis Indians players
Utica Utes players
Elmira Colonels players